Ricardo de Sousa Esgaio (born 16 May 1993) is a Portuguese professional footballer who plays for Sporting CP as a right-back.

Club career

Sporting CP
Born in Nazaré, Leiria District, Esgaio joined Sporting CP's youth system at the age of 12, having signed from local Grupo Desportivo os Nazarenos. On 14 December 2011 he was called for a UEFA Europa League group stage game away against S.S. Lazio, alongside youth graduates Betinho, Tiago Ilori, João Carlos and João Mário, as the Lions had already secured the first place in their group; he remained an unused substitute in the 2–0 loss.

On 11 August 2012, Esgaio made his senior debut with the reserves in the second division, playing 80 minutes in a 1–0 defeat at U.D. Oliveirense. He scored his first goal with the side the following matchday, the only in the home fixture against Vitória S.C. B; in his early career, he was mainly deployed as a right winger.

Esgaio made his first official appearance with Sporting's main squad on 7 December 2012, starting against Videoton FC in the last round of the Europa League group stage as the team were already eliminated from knockout stage contention, and featuring the entire 2–1 home win. He made his Primeira Liga debut on 5 January of the following year, playing the last minute of a 0–1 home loss to F.C. Paços de Ferreira. On 6 November 2013, back in the reserves, he netted a hat-trick in a 4–0 defeat of G.D. Chaves.

On 27 January 2015, both Esgaio and Sporting teammate Salim Cissé were loaned to fellow league club Académica de Coimbra until the end of the season.

Braga
On 17 June 2017, after only 44 competitive matches for Sporting in five years, Esgaio signed a five-year contract with S.C. Braga as Rodrigo Battaglia moved in the opposite direction. In his third match for his new team, away to C.D. Aves on 20 August, he came on as a last-minute substitute and scored his first goal in the top flight to seal a 2–0 victory.

Esgaio played seven games in the side's victorious run in the Taça de Portugal, including the full 90 minutes in the final against S.L. Benfica (2–0). In the last-16, he contributed one goal to the 5–0 rout of S.C.U. Torreense on 13 January 2021.

Return to Sporting
On 3 July 2021, Esgaio returned to Sporting on a five-year deal, for a €5,5 million fee with a €45 million buyout clause.

International career
Esgaio won 91 caps for Portugal at youth level. He was first choice for the under-21s at the 2015 UEFA European Championship, helping to a runner-up finish in the Czech Republic.

Personal life
Esgaio's younger brother, Tiago, is also a footballer.

Career statistics

Honours
Sporting CP
Taça de Portugal: 2014–15
Taça da Liga: 2021–22
Supertaça Cândido de Oliveira: 2021

Braga
Taça de Portugal: 2020–21
Taça da Liga: 2019–20

Portugal U21
UEFA European Under-21 Championship runner-up: 2015

References

External links

1993 births
Living people
People from Nazaré, Portugal
Sportspeople from Leiria District
Portuguese footballers
Association football defenders
Association football wingers
Association football utility players
Primeira Liga players
Liga Portugal 2 players
Sporting CP footballers
Sporting CP B players
Associação Académica de Coimbra – O.A.F. players
S.C. Braga players
Portugal youth international footballers
Portugal under-21 international footballers
Footballers at the 2016 Summer Olympics
Olympic footballers of Portugal